Gordon Bennett Cup may refer to:

 Gordon Bennett Cup (auto racing)
 Gordon Bennett Cup (ballooning), a gas balloon race

See also
 Gordon Bennett Trophy (aeroplanes), in the sport of air racing
 James Gordon Bennett Jr. (1841–1918) 
 Gordon Bennett (disambiguation)